Mujahid Shah Bahmani was the 3rd Sultan of the Bahmani sultanate. He was the son of Mohammed Shah I. Unlike his predecessors Mujahid only had a reign of 3 years as he was assassinated by his cousin Dawood Shah Bahmani after his unsuccessful campaign to Vijayanagara

Reign 
When Mujahid got the throne he got support from the Qadri Saint Sirajuddin Junaidi. The saint sent his own shirt and turban to  Mujahid which he wore it on during special occasions. He was taught the art of war and was fluent in Persian and Turki languages. He was proficient in archery and was a good swordsman. He was also affectionately called as Balwant or the 'strong or able-bodied one'. While he was crown prince, he broke the collar bone of Mubarak, The Royal Betel Leaf bearer during a wrestling bout. While campaigning in Vijayanagar he went to hunt a ferocious tiger in the vicinity of his camp with his select followers. While he got near to the Tiger, he pierced it's heart with his arrow. Later on he exaggerated that had his arrow missed the mark, he would have killed the Tiger with his own Dagger.

War with Vijayanagar 

Practically the whole of Mujahid's reign was concentrated on the campaign to Vijayanagar. The Raichur Doab has always been the contention between the two sides. Mujahid proposed to the King of Vijayanagara Bukka to cede the forts of Bankapur to him which the King found it ludicrous which made war inevitable. Mujahid decided to gain victory quickly by encircling the Kingdom's capital and ordered Safdar Khan Sistani to lay siege to the fort of Adoni. The King finding it untenable to oppose Mujahid's vast army left the capital and continued his struggle by waging a guerrilla war in the forest. For 6 months Mujahid tried to give battle to the King but in vain. But Bukka's health deteriorated and this forced him back to his capital and he died. He was succeeded by his son Harihara II. The campaign is described differently by Muslim Historians like Ferishta, Shirazi and Sayyid Ali.

Eventhough with this setback he nevertheless continued the battle. During the attack on the capital, Mujahid reached the great lake  overlooking the citadel, He attacked the Hill fort of the citadel where there was a temple dedicated to Sri Ranga which was covered with gold and silver. It was venerated by the local Hindus . It was plundered and it's edifice was razed off as the King considered it as a religious duty to establish Islam by the sword. He along with one follower Mahmud Afghan, crossed the lake with his black horse when he narrowly escaped murder from a Vijayanagara soldier by stabbing and killing him with his own sword. The Bahmani army was on the verge of victory but then the tides began change when the king with his army having 8000 Cavalry and many infantry joined the fray.
The Sultanate army was overwhelmed by the attack with its general Muqarrab Khan being killed. The situation could have been more precarious had not the King's  cousin Daud Khan performed a rearguard action with his 7000 infantry but he soon left the position unchecked for which  Mujahid reprimanded him. This made Mujahid realise that attacking the capital was futile and retreated towards the fort of Adoni.

The fort of Adoni was at that time laid to siege for 9 Months and was on the near point of capitulation due to lack of water, but then a heavy rain relieved the forces and they refused to capitulate and the situation became more better with the arrival of Chennapa Odeyar's reinforcements. The fort defied the peace treaty and actually killed one of the Sultan's deputy's and actually fired his head into the sultanate army camp . Eventually Chennapa Odeyar pushed the sultanate forces out of the fort and relieved the fort.
According to the Kunigal inscription dated to 1380 AD Chennapa Odeyar wrested 'from the hands of the Yavanas the territory they had seized, presented it as tribute to king Harihara'
All hope of a victory was soon lost and the sultanate army began to suffer from disease and famine. Mujahid had no choice but to retreat and cross the Tungabhadra river. The whole expedition was disbanded and the generals were sent back to their own provinces to govern.

Assassination 

On 17 April 1378,The King reached the fort of Mudgal and crossed the Krishna for a fishing expedition, then the stage was set for the worst. Masud Khan, Son of Mubarak the royal betel leaf bearer whom Mujahid broke his collar bone when he was a crown prince and Daud Khan, whom the king reprimanded for his negligence towards his position during the military campaign conspired to kill him and on that day they assassinated him in his tent and Daud himself ascended the throne after his death.

See also 
 Alauddin Bahman Shah

References

Bibliography 

History of India
Bahmani Sultans